Pikkara is a closed railway station in Adelaide, South Australia. It was a ground level stopping place during the passenger transport days of this line, and a 1965 reference mentioned that it was no longer used at that date. It was located just north of McMurtrie Road on the southeastern outskirts of McLaren Vale.

The stop is now completely disused, the entire Willunga railway line having been dismantled in 1972 and later replaced with the Coast to Vines Rail Trail.

References

Australian Railway Historical Society Bulletin No 336, October 1965

Disused railway stations in South Australia